A tribute (from Latin tributum, "contribution") is wealth, often in kind, that a party gives to another as a sign of submission, allegiance or respect. Various ancient states exacted tribute from the rulers of lands which the state conquered. In the case of alliances, lesser parties may pay tribute to more powerful parties as a sign of allegiance. Tributes are different from taxes, as they are not collected in the same regularly routine manner that taxes are. Further, with tributes, a recognition of political submission by the payer to the payee is uniquely required. The large sums, essentially protection money, paid by the later Roman and Byzantine Empires to barbarian peoples to prevent them attacking imperial territory, would not be considered tributes, as the Empire accepted no inferior political position.  A payment such as this that is paid by a superior political entity to an inferior one is instead known as a "subsidy".

Tribute Empires 
The ancient Persian Achaemenid Empire is an example of an ancient tribute empire; one that made relatively few demands on its non-Persian subjects other than the regular payment of tribute, which might be gold, luxury goods, animals, soldiers or slaves.  Failure to keep up the payments had dire consequences.  The reliefs at Persepolis show processions of figures bearing varied types of tribute.

The Aztec Empire is another example, as it received tribute from the various city-states and provinces that it conquered.

The medieval Mongol rulers of Russia also expected nothing more than tribute from the Russian states, which continued to govern themselves. 

Athens received tribute from the other cities of the Delian League.

The empires of Assyria, Babylon, Carthage and Rome exacted tribute from their provinces and subject kingdoms.

Ancient China received tribute from various states such as Japan, Korea, Vietnam, Cambodia, Borneo, Indonesia, Sri Lanka, Nepal, Myanmar and Central Asia (listed here).

Aztec Tribute Systems

Tributes as a Form of Government 
The Aztecs used tributes as a means for maintaining control over conquered areas. This meant that rather than replacing existing political figures with Aztec rulers or colonizing newly conquored areas, the Aztecs would simply collect tributes. Ideally, there was no interference in the local affairs of conquered peoples unless these tributes were not paid.

There were two types of provinces that paid tribute to the Aztec Empire. First, there were strategic provinces. These provinces were considered client states, as they consensually paid tributes in exchange for good relations with the Aztecs. Second, there were tributary provinces or tributary states. These provinces were mandated to pay a regular tribute, whether they wanted to or not.

The Hierarchy of Tribute Collection 
Many different levels of Aztec officials were involved in managing the empire's tribute system. The lowest ranking officials were known as calpixque. Their job was to collect, transport, and receive tributes from each province. Sometimes one calpixque was assigned to an entire province. Other times, multiple calpixques were assigned to each province. This was done to ensure that there was one calpixque present at each of the provinces' various towns. One rank higher than the calpixque were the huecalpixque. They served as managers of the calpixque. Above the huecalpixque were the petlacalcatl. Based in Tenochtitlan, they oversaw the entire tribute system.  There was also a military trained official known as the cuahtlatoani. They were only involved when newly conquered provinces resisted paying tribute.

Types of Tributes 
There were various forms of tributes that conquered Aztec provinces paid to the Aztec Empire.

Agriculture/Natural Resources 
Natural resources were in high demand throughout the Aztec Empire because they were crucial for construction, weaponry and religious ceremonies. Certain regions of Mexico with higher quantities of natural resources were able to pay a larger tribute. The basin of Mexico, for instance, had a large resource pool of obsidian and salt ware. This increased usefulness of such regions and played a role in their social status and mobility throughout the empire. 

A major factor that contributed to the efficiency and success of the Aztec Empire was the presence of Chinampas.  Chinampas were a very effective method of agriculture that both utilized and sustained the region, placing floating platforms on the water to collect nutrients and grow crops.  These chinampas contributed largely to the tribute that farmers would be demanded to pay to the Aztec government.

Military Service 
As expansion continued with tribute, the demand for warriors to serve the Empire in their efforts to take control of nearby city/state regions increased drastically.  “Land belonged to the city-state ruler, and in return for access to land commoners were obliged to provide their lord with tribute in goods and rotational labor service. They could also be called on for military service and construction projects.” It was very common to be called for military service, as it was vital to the expansion of the Aztec Empire.

Precious Metals
Tributes to the Aztec Empire were also made through gold, jade, silver and other metals that were important to Aztec culture and seen as valuable.  In episode five of the Aztec Empire graphic novel, the Aztecs are portrayed as having a large quantity of metals that they use to demonstrate their power and control over the region.  They discuss showing these tribute items “prepared for the strangers that came last year”  because they display power in Aztec culture.  Jade is a very valuable metal to the Aztecs, as it is commonly used in murals and cultural demonstrations and decorations to represent deities and people with high status.  Thus, these metals represent a valuable gift and are a popular tribute demand throughout the Aztec Empire.

Chinese practice of tributes as trade regulation and authority 

In Imperial China, the tributary system provided an administrative means to control their interests, as well as providing exclusive trading priorities to those who paid tribute from foreign regions. It was an integral part of the Confucian philosophy, seen by the Chinese as equivalent to younger sons looking after older parents by devoting part of their wealth, assets or goods to that purpose. Political marriages have existed between the Chinese empire and tribute states, such as Songtsen Gampo and Wencheng (Gyasa).

China often received tribute from the states under the influence of Confucian civilization and gave them Chinese products and recognition of their authority and sovereignty in return. There were several tribute states to the Chinese-established empires throughout ancient history, including neighboring countries such as Japan, Korea, Vietnam, Cambodia, Borneo, Indonesia and Central Asia. This tributary system and relationship are well known as Jimi (羈縻) or Cefeng (冊封), or Chaogong (朝貢). In Japanese, the tributary system and relationship is referred to as Shinkou (進貢), Sakuhou (冊封) and Choukou (朝貢).

According to the Chinese Book of Han, the various tribes of Japan (constituting the nation of Wa) had already entered into tributary relationships with China by the first century. However, Japan ceased to present tribute to China and left the tributary system during the Heian period without damaging economic ties. Although Japan eventually returned to the tributary system during the Muromachi period in the reign of Ashikaga Yoshimitsu, it did not recommence presenting tribute.

According to the Korean historical document Samguk Sagi, Goguryeo sent a diplomatic representative to the Han dynasty in 32 AD, and Emperor Guangwu of Han officially acknowledged Goguryeo with a title. The tributary relationship between China and Korea was established during the Three Kingdoms of Korea, but in practice it was only a diplomatic formality to strengthen legitimacy and gain access to cultural goods from China. This continued under different dynasties and varying degrees until China's defeat in the Sino-Japanese War of 1894–1895. 

The relationship between China and Vietnam was a "hierarchic tributary system". China ended its suzerainty over Vietnam with the Treaty of Tientsin (1885) following the Sino-French War. Thailand was always subordinate to China as a vassal or a tributary state since the Sui dynasty until the Taiping Rebellion of the late Qing dynasty in the mid-19th century.

Some tributaries of imperial China encompasses suzerain kingdoms from China in East Asia has been prepared. Before the 20th century, the geopolitics of East and Southeast Asia were influenced by the Chinese tributary system. This assured them their sovereignty and the system assured China the incoming of certain valuable assets. "The theoretical justification" for this exchange was the Mandate of Heaven, that stated the fact that the Emperor of China was empowered by the heavens to rule, and with this rule the whole mankind would end up being beneficiary of good deeds. Most of the Asian countries joined this system voluntary.

There is a clear differentiation between the term "tribute" and "gift." The former, known as gong (貢), has important connotations. The Chinese emperors made sure that the gifts they paid to other states were known as mere gifts, not tributes. Even at times when a Chinese dynasty had to bribe nomads from raiding their border such as in the Han Dynasty and the Song Dynasty, the emperors gave "gifts" to the Xiongnu and the Khitan. The only time when a dynasty paid formal tribute to another was during the southern Song dynasty, where tribute was given to the Jin Dynasty for peace. The Jin Dynasty, having occupied the plains around the Yellow River, also saw itself as the legitimate holder of the "Mandate of Heaven".

In addition, during Zheng He's expeditions, his fleet often returned with foreign envoys bearing tribute. The foreign states received gifts in return to build tributary relationships between the Ming Dynasty and the foreign kingdoms. Tribute activities occupy several chapters in the Twenty-Four Histories.

Western European notions of tribute in medieval times

Raiders, like Vikings and Celtic tribes, could also exact tribute instead of raiding the place if the potential targets agreed to pay an agreed amount of valuables; the Danegeld is a famous and large-scale example.

Tribute was not always money, but also valuables, effectively making the payers hostages kept unpillaged in exchange for good behaviour. Various medieval lords required tribute from their vassals or peasants, nominally in exchange for protection to incur the costs of raising armies, or paying for free-lance mercenaries against a hostile neighbouring state. That system evolved into medieval taxation and co-existed as a secular approximation of the churchly tithe levied on production.

The Islamic Caliphate

The Islamic Caliphate introduced a new form of tribute, known as the 'jizya', that differed significantly from earlier Roman forms of tribute. According to Patricia Seed:

Christians of the Iberian Peninsula translated the term 'jizya' as tributo. This form of tribute was later also applied by the Spanish empire to their territories in the New World.

Tribute in the modern era

Modern elements of tribute are restricted to highly formal and ceremonial rituals, such as formal gifts being given to prove either fealty or loyalty upon the inauguration of a president, a wedding of a president's child while the president is in office, or the accession or the marriage of a member of a royal family.

See also
 Tributary system of China
 List of tributary states of China
 List of recipients of tribute from China
 Puppet state
 Satellite state
 Suzerainty
 Vassal state
 Tributary state
 Taxation

References

Citations

Sources 

 Kwak, Tae-Hwan and Seung-Ho Joo. (2003). The Korean Peace process and the Four powers. Burlington, Vermont: Ashgate. ; OCLC 156055048
 Pratt, Keith L., Richard Rutt and James Hoare. (1999). Korea: a Historical and Cultural Dictionary. Richmond: Curzon Press. ; ; OCLC 245844259

External links 
 

International relations
Client state
Racketeering
Feudalism
History of diplomacy